The Chinese grouse (Tetrastes sewerzowi), also known as Severtzov's grouse or the black-breasted hazel grouse,  is a grouse species closely related to the hazel grouse.

It is a sedentary bird which inhabits conifer-rich mixed montane forests of central China. The bird is very similar in appearance to the hazel grouse apart from less of a white stripe on the head and neck.

The bird is named after a Russian explorer and naturalist, Nikolai Alekseevich Severtzov.

Chinese grouse is legally an endangered species in China, in the area in which its most centrally located. The population has been declining over the years and is still showing this decrease in numbers. The Chinese grouse has around 10,000 birds currently according to the Nordic Board for Wildlife Research. The main cause of this decline is due to habitat loss by deforestation. There are many forestry practices, habitat fragmentation, and decrease in area of coniferous forests that contribute to the reasons this species is in decline. Current efforts are being made in China to stop such a dramatic decline in the species such as halted logging of the forests.

The complete mitochondrial genome of this species was published in July 2014.

Taxonomy 
The black-breasted hazel grouse has two recognized subspecies:

 T. s. secundus (Riley, 1925)
 T. s. sewerzowi (Przevalski, 1876)

References

External links
ARKive - images and movies of the Chinese grouse (Bonasa sewerzowi)
BirdLife Species Factsheet

Chinese grouse
Chinese grouse
Birds of China
Birds of Asia
Birds of Central China
Endemic birds of China
Chinese grouse
Chinese grouse